Uuno Laakso (1896–1956) was a Finnish film actor. He was married to the actress Rakel Laakso.

He is buried in the Hietaniemi Cemetery in Helsinki.

Selected filmography
 Voi meitä! Anoppi tulee (1933)
 Substitute Wife (1936)
 Soot and Gold (1945)

References

Bibliography 
 Pietari Kääpä. Directory of World Cinema: Finland. Intellect Books, 2012.

External links 
 

1896 births
1956 deaths
People from Hollola
People from Häme Province (Grand Duchy of Finland)
Finnish male film actors
Finnish male silent film actors
Burials at Hietaniemi Cemetery